We Move is the third studio album by Irish singer-songwriter James Vincent McMorrow. Produced in part by Nineteen85 and Frank Dukes, the album marks the musician's transition from folk to minimalistic R&B.
It was recorded in Los Angeles, Toronto and Dublin, and released on 2 September 2016.

Background
James Vincent McMorrow met producer Nineteen85 in 2014 in Toronto, when they were introduced to work together on material for other artists. However, McMorrow kept most of the results of the collaboration to himself. In an interview with the London Evening Standard, he said about Nineteen85, "He was the catalyst for the album. He was the one constantly texting and emailing me, wanting to know when we were gonna make my record. He saw something in it that I wasn't seeing at the time. He heard something."

On the album, McMorrow opens up and sings for the first time about mental health problems he had as a teenager. The song "I Lie Awake Every Night" deals with an eating disorder that left him hospitalised in a mental health unit weighing somewhere between 32 and 35 kilograms. McMorrow said in the interview, "I just wasn't coping well with life. ... I just have a predisposition towards control and wanting to have control of my life. The classic thing with eating disorders is that when life is out of control, it's the one thing that you can control."
He also admitted that the mental health problems were something he ran away from pretty aggressively when he was in his twenties. "I'm a classic example of a person who keeps their mouth shut. I just ran away from it going, 'I’m fine, I'm totally grand'. Now I have things to say that I wasn't confident enough to sing or talk about five years ago."

Promotion
The album is promoted by the lead single "Rising Water", which was released on 5 July 2016. A music video for the song, directed by David M. Helman, was released on 8 August 2016.
In October and November 2016, McMorrow will also tour Europe and the United States in support of the album.

Track listing

Notes
  signifies a co-producer

Personnel
Credits adapted from AllMusic

Musicians
James Byrne – drums
Frank Dukes – CS-80, Juno (track 2)
Kaan Gunesberk – bass, electric guitar, background vocals (track 2)
James Vincent McMorrow – vocals, drums, Fender Jazz bass, Fender Rhodes, electric guitar, keyboards, Moog bass, piano, Polysix, Prophet 5, synthesizer, synthesizer bass, Yamaha keyboards
Nineteen85 – bass, keyboards, piano, synthesizer, synthesizer bass
Two Inch Punch – keyboards, synthesizer, synthesizer bass

Additional personnel
Samuel Burgess-Johnson – design
Emma Doyle – cover photo

Technical
Greg Calbi – mastering
John Davis – mastering
Kevin Dietz – engineering
Jimmy Douglas – mixing
Ross Dowling – additional production, engineering, mixing
Frank Dukes – drum programming, production
Phil Hayes – drum engineering, engineering
John O'Mahony – mixing
James Vincent McMorrow – production, additional production
Nineteen85 – drum programming, production
Two Inch Punch – drum programming, production

Charts

Release history

References

2016 albums
James Vincent McMorrow albums
Albums produced by Frank Dukes
Albums produced by Nineteen85